
This is a list of aircraft in alphabetical order beginning with 'Bf' through 'Bo'.

Bf–Bo

BFW

(Bayerische Flugzeugwerke AG)
 BFW 1 Sperber
 BFW 3 Marabu
 BFW CL.I
 BFW CL.II
 BFW CL.III
 BFW Cl.IV
 BFW M.17
 BFW M.18
 BFW M.19
 BFW M.20
 BFW M.21
 BFW M.22
 BFW M.23
 BFW M.24
 BFW M.25
 BFW M.26
 BFW M.27
 BFW M.28
 BFW M.29
 BFW M.30
 BFW M.31
 BFW M.32
 BFW M.33
 BFW M.34
 BFW M.35
 BFW M.36
 BFW M.37 (Bf108)
 BFW Monoplane 1918
 BFW N.I
 BFW type 17 Cl.I
 BFW type 18 Cl.II

Bharat

 Bharat Swati

BIAA 

(Beijing Institute of Aeronautics and Astronautics)
  BIAA Mifeng-1
  BIAA Mifeng-2
  BIAA Mifeng-3
  BIAA Mifeng-4
  BIAA Mifeng-4A
  BIAA Mifeng-5
  BIAA Mifeng-6
  BIAA Mifeng-7
  BIAA Mifeng-8
  BIAA Mifeng-9
  BIAA Mifeng-10
  BIAA Mifeng-11

Biddy-Buddy 

(Rene Durenleau, Rantoul, IL)
 Biddy-Buddy 1958 Biplane

Bidwell 

((William Burgess) Bidwell-(Shirley) Yale Aviation Co, Gardiner Airport, Portland, OR)
 Bidwell Cloud Buster Junior

Biemond 

(C Biemond)
 Biemond CB-1

Biggs 

(Floyd Biggs, OK)
 Biggs A Special

Bille S.A.C.A.N.A.
 Bille S.A.C.A.N.A. triplane bomber

Billman 

 Billman B.11 Little Pink Cloud

Bilsam Aviation

(Poznań, Poland)
Bilsam Sky Cruiser
Bilsam Sky Walker
Bilsam Sky Walker I
Bilsam Sky Walker II
Bilsam Ultra Cruiser

Bing

(George J. Bing)
 Bing 1911 biplane

Biplanes Of Yesteryear

(Ontario, OR)
Biplanes Of Yesteryear Mifyter

Bircham

 Bircham Beetle

Bird 

(Bird Aircraft Co. / (Joe & Harry) Brunner-(William E) Winkle Aircraft Corp, 17 Haverkamp St, Glendale, NY)
 Bird C
 Bird E
 Bird F
 Perth-Amboy RK

Bird 

((W W) Bird Aircraft Co, 1905 Atlantic, San Diego, CA)
 Bird Air Bus 1

Bird 

(Bird Corporation, Palm Springs, CA)
 Bird Innovator

Bird 

(Cory Bird, Mojave, CA)
 Bird Symmetry

Birdman

 Birdman TL-1

Birdman

(Birdman Enterprises)
 Birdman Chinook WT-11-277
 Birdman Chinook WT-11-377
 Birdman Chinook 1S
 Birdman Chinook 2S
 ASAP Chinook Plus 2

Bird Wing 

(Bird Wing Commercial Aircraft Co.)
 Bird Wing Model 1
 Bird Wing Imperial

BIS

(Bylinkin-Iordan-Sikorsky)
 BIS 1910 pusher biplane
 BIS 1910 tractor biplane

Bishop 

 Bishop RB-1 Ray's Rebel

Bisnovat 

 Bisnovat 5
 Bisnovat SK-1
 Bisnovat SK-2
 Bisnovat SK-3

Bittner 
(Raymond Bittner, Chicago, IL)
 Brittner-Four
 Bittner RA-1

BJJR
 BJJR Bulldog

BK Fliers 

(BK Fliers / Bruce King)
 BK Fliers BK-1

Bksut 

 Bksut Eleisson

Blackburn 

(deForest Blackburn, St Louis, MO)
 Blackburn Sportair Coupe

Blackburn 

 Blackburn B-1 Segrave
 Blackburn B-2
 Blackburn B-3 (Specification M.1/30)
 Blackburn B-5 Baffin
 Blackburn B-6 Shark
 Blackburn B-7
 Blackburn B-9 (H.S.T. 10)
 Blackburn B-20
 Blackburn B-24 Skua
 Blackburn B-25 Roc
 Blackburn B-26 Botha
 Blackburn B-37 Firebrand F.I
 Blackburn B-44
 Blackburn B-45 Firebrand TF Mk.II
 Blackburn B-46 Firebrand TF Mk.IV
 Blackburn B-48 Firecrest (SBAC - Y.A.1)
 Blackburn B-54 (SBAC - Y.A.5, Y.A.7, Y.A.8)
 Blackburn B-88 (SBAC - Y.B.1)
 Blackburn B-101 Beverley
 Blackburn B-103 Buccaneer (SBAC - Y.B.3)
 Blackburn B-107A
 Blackburn B.T.1 Beagle
 Blackburn 2F.1 Nautilus
 Blackburn C.A.15C
 Blackburn C.B.2 Nile
 Blackburn F.1 Turcock
 Blackburn F.2 Lincock
 Blackburn F.3 (F.7/30)
 Blackburn G.P.
 Blackburn L.1 Bluebird
 Blackburn L.1c Bluebird IV
 Blackburn R.B.1 Iris
 Blackburn R.B.2 Sydney
 Blackburn R.B.3A Perth
 Blackburn R.T.1 Kangaroo
 Blackburn R.1 Blackburn
 Blackburn R.2 Airedale
 Blackburn T.1 Swift
 Blackburn T.2 Dart
 Blackburn T.3 Velos
 Blackburn T.4 Cubaroo
 Blackburn T.5 Ripon
 Blackburn T.7B
 Blackburn T.R.1 Sprat
 Blackburn T.B. Twin Blackburn
 Blackburn Type B
 Blackburn Type D
 Blackburn Type E
 Blackburn Type I
 Blackburn Type L
 Blackburn AD Scout
 Alula D.H.6
 Alula Semiquaver (1921) - single-engine experimental wing conversion of the Martinsyde Semiquaver
 Blackburn First Monoplane
 Blackburn Second Monoplane
 Blackburn Blackburd
 Blackburn Mercury
 Blackburn Pellet
 Blackburd Sidecar
 Blackburn Triplane
 Blackburn White Falcon

Black Diamond 

(Diamond Airplane Co, Black Diamond, CA)
 Black Diamond 1910 Biplane

Blackshape

(Blackshape srl, Monopoli, Italy)
Blackshape Prime

Blackstar 
 Blackstar Plane

Blackwing Sweden
(Lund, Sweden)
Blackwing Sweden Blackwing

Blake

Blake Bluetit

Blanc

(Maurice Blanc)
 Monoplan Maurice Blanc 1911

Blanchard

(Société des Avions Blanchard)
 Blanchard BB-1
 Blanchard BB.2 (Anybody have a reference or evidence of this, or is it a typo / confusion with the BB.1?)
 Blanchard Brd.1

Blanchet 

(Jean Blanchet)
 Blanchet JB.01 Chantecler
 Blanchet JB.60-2

Blavier 

(Gérard Blavier)
 Blavier 8C2

Blenet 

(Roger Blenet)
 Blenet RB.01 Jozé

Blériot 
 Blériot four-engined bomber
 Blériot Parasol
 Blériot I
 Blériot II
 Blériot III
 Blériot IV
 Blériot V
 Blériot VI
 Blériot VII
 Blériot VIII
 Blériot IX
 Blériot X
 Blériot XI
 Blériot XII
 Blériot XIII
 Blériot XIV
 Blériot XV
 Blériot XXI
 Blériot XXIII
 Blériot XXIV
 Blériot XXV
 Blériot XXVII
 Blériot XXXIII Canard Bleu
 Blériot XXXVI Torpille
 Blériot XXXVIbis La Vache
 Blériot XXXIX
 Blériot XLII
 Blériot XLIII
 Blériot XLIV
 Blériot XLV
 Blériot 53
 Blériot 65
 Blériot 67
 Blériot 71
 Blériot 72
 Blériot 73
 Blériot 74
 Blériot 75
 Blériot 76
 Blériot 77
 Blériot 102
 Blériot 105
 Blériot 106
 Blériot 110
 Blériot 111
 Blériot 115
 Blériot 117
 Blériot 118
 Blériot 123
 Blériot 125
 Blériot 127
 Blériot 135
 Blériot 137
 Blériot 155
 Blériot 165
 Blériot 175
 Blériot 195
 Blériot 290
 Blériot 5190
 Blériot-SPAD S.XIV - single-seat fighter seaplane (1917)
 Blériot-SPAD S.XVII
 Blériot-SPAD S.XVIII
 Blériot-SPAD S.XX
 Blériot-SPAD S.XXI
 Blériot-SPAD S.XXII
 Blériot-SPAD S.XXIV
 Blériot-SPAD S.25
 Blériot-SPAD S.26
 Blériot-SPAD S.27
 Blériot-SPAD S.28
 Blériot-SPAD S.29
 Blériot-SPAD S.30
 Blériot-SPAD S.31
 Blériot-SPAD S.32
 Blériot-SPAD S.33
 Blériot-SPAD S.34
 Blériot-SPAD S.36
 Blériot-SPAD S.37
 Blériot-SPAD S.38
 Blériot-SPAD S.39
 Blériot-SPAD S.40
 Blériot-SPAD S.41
 Blériot-SPAD S.42
 Bleriot-SPAD S.45 (1921) 4-engine transport
 Blériot-SPAD S.46
 Blériot-SPAD S.48
 Blériot-SPAD S.50
 Blériot-SPAD S.51
 Blériot-SPAD S.54
 Blériot-SPAD S.54-1
 Blériot-SPAD S.56
 Blériot-SPAD S.58
 Blériot-SPAD S.60
 Blériot-SPAD S.61
 Blériot-SPAD S.62
 Blériot-SPAD S.64
 Blériot-SPAD S.66
 Blériot-SPAD S.70
 Blériot-SPAD S.71
 Blériot-SPAD S.72
 Blériot-SPAD S.81
 Blériot-SPAD S.82
 Blériot-SPAD S.86
 Blériot-SPAD S.91
 Blériot-SPAD S.92
 Blériot-SPAD S.116
 Blériot-SPAD S.126
 Blériot-SPAD S.510
 Blériot-SPAD S.540
 Blériot-SPAD S.710

Blessing
(Gerhard Blessing)
 Blessing Rebell

Bley
(Bley Flugzeugbau GmbH, Naumberg)
 Bley M-Condor

Blinderman-Mayorov

(И. А. Блиндерман & В. В. Майоров)
 Blinderman-Mayorov monoplane (named Ery or Kass (France, 1911))

Bloch 

(Avions Marcel Bloch)
 Bloch MB.30  eight-seat twin-engined communications aircraft project (not built)
 Bloch MB.60
 Bloch MB.61
 Bloch MB.70
 Bloch MB.71
 Bloch MB.80
 Bloch MB.81
 Bloch MB.90
 Bloch MB.91
 Bloch MB.92
 Bloch MB.93
 Bloch MB.100
 Bloch MB.110
 Bloch MB.120
 Bloch MB.130
 Bloch MB.131
 Bloch MB.132
 Bloch MB.133
 Bloch MB.134
 Bloch MB.135
 Bloch MB.136
 Bloch MB.140(1)  single-seat, single-engine low-wing monoplane derived from the MB.80, with a 140 hp Renault 4 Pei engine
 Bloch MB.140(2)  three-seater four-engine, sort of a "Super 175" type
 Bloch MB.141
 Bloch MB.150
 Bloch MB.151
 Bloch MB.152
 Bloch MB.153
 Bloch MB.154
 Bloch MB.155
 Bloch MB.156
 Bloch MB.157
 Bloch MB.160
 Bloch MB.161
 Bloch MB.162 (1) (mailplane)
 Bloch MB.162 (2) (bomber)
 Bloch MB.162Bn.5
 Bloch MB.163
 Bloch MB.170 (1)  civilian transport version of first MB.140 project
 Bloch MB.170  twin-engined reconnaissance aircraft / light bomber (2 built)
 Bloch MB.171
 Bloch MB.172
 Bloch MB.173
 Bloch MB.174
 Bloch MB.175
 Bloch MB.176
 Bloch MB.177
 Bloch MB.178
 Bloch MB.179
 Bloch MB.200
 Bloch MB.201
 Bloch MB.202
 Bloch MB.203
 Bloch MB.210
 Bloch MB.211
 Bloch MB.212
 Bloch MB.218
 Bloch MB.220
 Bloch MB.221
 Bloch MB.300 Pacifique
 Bloch MB.301
 Bloch MB.303
 Bloch MB.304
 Bloch MB.400
 Bloch MB.462
 Bloch MB.480
 Bloch MB.500 (1)
 Bloch MB.500 (2)
 Bloch MB.690 (1)
 Bloch MB.700
 Bloch MB.720 (1)
 Bloch MB.730 (1)
 Bloch MB.800
 Bloch MB.900  became SO.90, under which designation it was built
 Bloch MB.1010 fighter project from 1939, also known as S.O.10 (not built)
 Bloch MB.1011  development of the MB.1010, also known as S.O.11 (not built)
 Bloch MB.1020  proposed commercial transport for 20 passengers; only a fuselage completed  by June 1040; also known as S.O.20
 Bloch MB.1020R  transport design with 2 × G&R 14R engines (1946)
 Bloch MB.1030  also known as S.O.30, under which designation it was built
 Bloch MB.1040

Blohm & Voss 

(For World War II projects with no RLM designation see: List of German aircraft projects, 1939-1945: Blohm & Voss)
 Blohm & Voss BV 138
 Blohm & Voss BV 141
 Blohm & Voss BV 142
 Blohm & Voss BV 143
 Blohm & Voss BV 144
 Blohm & Voss BV 155
 Blohm & Voss BV 222
 Blohm & Voss BV 237
 Blohm & Voss BV 238
 Blohm & Voss BV 246 Hagelkorn
 Blohm & Voss BV 250
 Blohm & Voss BV 40

Bloudek

 Bloudek XV Lojze

Blue Max Ulralight

 Blue Max Ultralight Blue Max

Blue Yonder 

(Blue Yonder Aviation)
 Blue Yonder EZ Fun Flyer
 Blue Yonder Merlin
 Blue Yonder EZ Flyer
 Blue Yonder EZ King Cobra
 Blue Yonder Twin Engine EZ Flyer
 Blue Yonder EZ Harvard

Blume

 Blume Bl.500
 Blume Bl.502
 Blume Bl.503

Blume-Hentzen
 Blume-Hentzen Habicht

Bob Anderson Sport Aircraft 

 Bob Anderson Sport Aircraft Mini-Coupe

Bock

(John W. Bock, Los Lunas, NM)
 Bock Model 2

Bode

(John Bode, Augusta, KS)
 Bode Drag 'n' Fly

Bodiansky

(Michel Bodiansky)
 Bodiansky 20
 Bodiansky 30

Boeing 

 Boeing Model B-1
 Boeing Model B-1D 
 Boeing Model B-1E
 Boeing Model C
 Boeing Model 1
 Boeing Model 2
 Boeing Model 3
 Boeing Model 4
 Boeing Model 5
 Boeing Model 6
 Boeing Model 6D
 Boeing Model 6E
 Boeing Model 7
 Boeing Model 8
 Boeing Model 908-909
 Boeing 10
 Boeing 15
 Boeing 21
 Boeing 40
 Boeing 42
 Boeing 50
 Boeing 53
 Boeing 54
 Boeing 55
 Boeing 56
 Boeing 57
 Boeing 58
 Boeing 63
 Boeing 64
 Boeing 66
 Boeing 67
 Boeing 69
 Boeing 74
 Boeing 77
 Boeing 80
 Boeing 81
 Boeing 83
 Boeing 89
 Boeing 93
 Boeing 95
 Boeing 96
 Boeing 97
 Boeing 99
 Boeing 100
 Boeing 101
 Boeing 102
 Boeing 200
 Boeing 202
 Boeing 203
 Boeing 204
 Boeing 205
 Boeing 209
 Boeing 214
 Boeing 215
 Boeing 218
 Boeing 221
 Boeing 222
 Boeing 223
 Boeing 226
 Boeing 227
 Boeing 235
 Boeing 236
 Boeing 246
 Boeing 247
 Boeing 248
 Boeing 251
 Boeing 256
 Boeing 264
 Boeing 266
 Boeing 267
 Boeing 272
 Boeing 273
 Boeing 274
 Boeing 276
 Boeing 278
 Boeing 281
 Boeing 294
 Boeing 299
 Boeing 306
 Boeing 307 Stratoliner / Strato-clipper / C-75
 Boeing 314 Clipper
 Boeing 316
 Boeing 320
 Boeing 322
 Boeing 333
 Boeing 334
 Boeing 337
 Boeing 341
 Boeing 344
 Boeing 345
 Boeing 345-2
 Boeing 367 Stratofreighter
 Boeing 367-80
 Boeing 377 Stratocruiser
 Boeing 400
 Boeing 417 post World War II feeder liner design never built  
 Boeing 424
 Boeing 432
 Boeing 448
 Boeing 450
 Boeing 451
 Boeing 452
 Boeing 464
 Boeing 473
 Boeing 474
 Boeing 479
 Boeing 701
 Boeing 707
 Boeing 707 Phalcon/Condor
 Boeing 717 Stratotanker
 Boeing 717 (MD-95)
 Boeing 717-231
 Boeing 720
 Boeing 727
 Boeing 727 Spec
 Boeing 727-224/Adv(F)
 Boeing 737
 Boeing 737 AEW&C
 Boeing 737-73W BBJ
 Boeing 737-86N
 Boeing 737-8V3
 Boeing 737-100
 Boeing 737-200
 Boeing 737-300
 Boeing 737-522
 Boeing 737-700C
 Boeing 737-724
 Boeing 737-824(WL)
 Boeing 737-900ER
 Boeing 737-990ER
 Boeing 737-3Q8
 Boeing 737-8Q8
 Boeing 737-7H4
 Boeing 737-7L9
 Boeing 737-89P(WL)
 Boeing 737 MAX
 Boeing 737 MAX8
 Boeing 739
 Boeing 747
 Boeing 747 Supertanker
 Boeing 747-8 (formerly 747 Advanced)
 Boeing 747-8F
 Boeing 747-8FZ
 Boeing 747-100
 Boeing 747-156
 Boeing 747-200
 Boeing 747-400
 Boeing 747-406(M)
 Boeing 747-412F/SCD
 Boeing 747-4B5F(ER) 
 Boeing 747-432(ER) 
 Boeing 747-436
 Boeing 747-830 C/N 37827)
 Boeing 747SP
 Boeing 747 Dreamlifter
 Boeing 757
 Boeing 757-2D7
 Boeing 757-351
 Boeing 763
 Boeing 767
 Boeing 767 LuxuryLiner
 Boeing 767-200
 Boeing 767-200ER
 Boeing 767-223ER
 Boeing 767-346(ER)
 Boeing 767-3Y0
 Boeing 767 EC-547
 Boeing 767-332/ER
 Boeing E-767
 Boeing KC-767
 Boeing 777
 Boeing 777X
 Boeing 777-3DZ
 Boeing 777-232(LR)
 Boeing 777-289
 Boeing 777-3FX(ER)
 Boeing 787
 Boeing 787-8
 Boeing 787-9
 Boeing 787 Dreamliner
 Boeing 797
 Boeing 7E7
 Boeing 7J7 (cancelled)
 Boeing 953
 Boeing 2707 (cancelled)
 Boeing YAL-1
 Boeing A7-BAO
 Boeing AT-3
 Boeing B-9
 Boeing XB-15
 Boeing B-17 Flying Fortress
 Boeing Y1B-20
 Boeing B-29 Superfortress
 Boeing XB-38 Flying Fortress
 Boeing XB-39 Superfortress
 Boeing B-40 Flying Fortress
 Boeing B-44 Superfortress
 Boeing B-47 Stratojet
 Boeing B-50 Superfortress
 Boeing B-52 Stratofortress
 Boeing B-54
 Boeing XB-55
 Boeing B-56
 Boeing XB-59
 Boeing BLR-1
 Boeing BFB
 Boeing BQ-7
 Boeing YC-14
 Boeing C-17 Globemaster III
 Boeing C-18 Monomail
 Boeing C-18
 Boeing C-19
 Boeing C-22
 Boeing VC-25
 Boeing C-32
 Boeing C-33
 Boeing C-40 Clipper
 Boeing KC-46
 Boeing KC-135R/751
 Boeing C-73
 Boeing C-75
 Boeing C-97 Stratofreighter
 Boeing KC-97 Stratofreighter
 Boeing C-98
 Boeing C-105
 Boeing C-108 Flying Fortress
 Boeing C-127
 Boeing C-135 Stratolifter
 Boeing KC-135 Stratotanker
 Boeing EC-135
 Boeing RC-135
 Boeing C-137 Stratoliner
 VC-137C SAM 26000
 VC-137C SAM 27000
 Boeing CO-7
 Boeing E-3 Sentry
 Boeing E-4
 Boeing E4B Nightwatch
 Boeing E-6 Mercury
 Boeing E-10 MC2A
 Boeing F-9
 Boeing F-18 Super Hornet
 Boeing FB
 Boeing F2B
 Boeing F3B Seahawk
 Boeing F4B
 Boeing F5B
 Boeing F6B
 Boeing F7B
 Boeing F8B
 Boeing GA-1
 Boeing GA-2
 Boeing AH-64 Apache
 Boeing HRB
 Boeing L-15 Scout
 Boeing LHR-DOH
 Boeing NB
 Boeing N2B
 Boeing OB
 Boeing O2B
 Boeing XP-4
 Boeing XP-7
 Boeing XP-8
 Boeing X-8A Poseidon
 Boeing XP-9
 Boeing P-12
 Boeing XP-15
 Boeing P-26 Peashooter
 Boeing P-29
 Boeing P-32
 Boeing XP-925
 Boeing XP-936
 Boeing XP-940
 Boeing PB
 Boeing PB-1W Flying Fortress
 Boeing PB Flying Fortress
 Boeing P2B
 Boeing P3B
 Boeing PB2B Catalina
 Boeing PBB Sea Ranger
 Boeing PW-9
 Boeing T-43
 Boeing/BAE Systems T-45 Goshawk
 Boeing TB
 Boeing X-20 Dyna-Soar
 Boeing X-32
 Boeing X-37 Future-X
 Boeing X-40
 Boeing X-43
 Boeing X-45
 Boeing X-46
 Boeing X-48
 Boeing X-50
 Boeing X-53 Active Aeroelastic Wing
 B & W Seaplane
 Boeing AXB
 Boeing Navy Experimental Type B Carrier Fighter
 Boeing A-213 Totem - see List of aircraft (Bf–Bo)#Boeing Aircraft of Canada
 Boeing BB-1
 Boeing BB-L6
 Boeing Bird of Prey
 Boeing BX
 Boeing Business Jet
 Boeing C-204 Thunderbird - see List of aircraft (Bf–Bo)#Boeing Aircraft of Canada
 Boeing C-700
 Boeing CC-137 Husky Canadian Armed Forces
 Boeing CL-4S
 Boeing Courier
 Boeing DH-4M
 Boeing Dreamlifter
 Boeing E-767
 Boeing EA
 Boeing GA-1
 Boeing GA-2
 Boeing NLA
 Boeing Pelican
 Boeing Phantom Ray
 Boeing QSRA
 Boeing Skyfox
 Boeing Sonic Cruiser
 Boeing T-7 Red Hawk
 Boeing SLV Stage 1 (supersonic reusable launch vehicle)
 Boeing SLV Stage 2 (hypersoinic, scramjet-powered reusable launch vehicle)
 Boeing Airpower Teaming System
 Boeing Wedgetail

Boeing-Stearman 

 Boeing-Stearman Model X-70
 Boeing-Stearman Model 75
 Boeing-Stearman Model 76
 Boeing-Stearman Model X-85
 Boeing-Stearman Model 88
 Boeing-Stearman Model X-90
 Boeing-Stearman Model X-91
 Boeing-Stearman Model X-100
 Boeing-Stearman Model X-120
 Boeing-Stearman XA-21
 Boeing-Stearman XAT-15
 Boeing-Stearman XBT-17
 Boeing-Stearman PT-13 Kaydet
 Boeing-Stearman PT-17 Kaydet
 Boeing-Stearman PT-18
 Boeing-Stearman PT-27

Boeing-Vertol 

 Boeing-Vertol 107
 Boeing-Vertol 107-II
 Boeing-Vertol 114
 Boeing-Vertol 165
 Boeing-Vertol 173
 Boeing-Vertol 176
 Boeing-Vertol 179
 Boeing-Vertol 219
 Boeing-Vertol 234
 Boeing-Vertol 301
 Boeing-Vertol 347
 Boeing-Vertol 352
 Boeing-Vertol 360
 Boeing-Vertol 414
 Boeing-Vertol H-46 Sea Knight
 Boeing-Vertol H-47 Chinook
 Boeing-Vertol H-61
 Boeing-Vertol H-62
 Boeing-Vertol HC-1A
 Boeing-Vertol HC-1B
 Boeing-Vertol HLH
 Boeing-Vertol HRB
 Boeing-Vertol Commercial Chinook
 Boeing-Vertol CH-113 Labrador Canadian Armed Forces
 Boeing-Vertol CH-147 Chinook Canadian Armed Forces
 Boeing-Vertol YUH-61

Boeing Aircraft of Canada
 Boeing-Canada C-204 Thunderbird
 Boeing-Canada 40H-4
 Boeing-Canada A-213 Totem
 Boeing-Canada PB2B-1
 Boeing-Canada PB2B-2

Boeing School of Aeronautics

 Boeing School T-5
 Boeing School T-6

Boeing-Sikorsky 

 Boeing-Sikorsky RAH-66 Comanche

Bogardus 

(George Bogardus, Troutdale OR, and Eyerly Aircraft Corp, Salem, OR)
 Bogardus Little Gee Bee

Bogut 

(Ed L. Bogut, Havre, MT)
 Bogut Model A

Bohannon 

(Bruce Bohannon)
 Bohannon B-1

Bohatyrew
(Michal Bohatyrew)
 Bohatyrew Kaczka-Nadzieja (Kaczka-Nadzieja - Duck-the Hope / canard)sic

Bohemia

Bohemia B-5

Boillon 

(Jean Boillon)
 Boillon JAB.60 Fulmo

Boisavia

(Société Boisavia)
 Boisavia B-50 Muscadet
 Boisavia B-60 Mercurey
 Boisavia B-80 Chablis
 Boisavia B-260 Anjou

BOK 

(Byuro Osovikh Konstruktskii - experimental aircraft design bureau)
 Chizhevski BOK-1
 Krichyevskii BOK-2
 BOK-3
 Chizhevski BOK-5
 BOK-6
 BOK-7
 BOK-8
 BOK-11
 BOK-15
 BOK SS
 BOK RK
 BOK TB

Bokor 

(Maurice Bokor (also seen as Morris Boker), Bronx, NY)
 Bokor 1909 triplane

Boland 

((Frank E & Joseph) Boland Aeroplane & Motor Co, Rahway, NJ and Mineola, NY, 1928: Boland Aeroplane Co, Newark, NJ)
 Boland Tailless Triplane
 Boland 1911 Tailless Biplane
 Boland 1911 Conventional Biplane
 Boland 1912 Tailless Biplane
 Boland 1912 Tailless Flying Boat
 Boland 1914 Monoplane Flying Boat
 Boland 1914 Biplane Flying Boat

Bolkhovitinov 

 Bolkhovitinov DB-A
 Bolkhovitinov DB-2A
 Bolkhovitinov TK-1
 Bolkhovitinov DBA
 Bolkhovitinov BDD
 Bolkhovitinov S
 Bolkhovitinov I
 Bolkhovitinov D
 Bolkhovitinov BBS
 Bolkhovitinov BB
 Bolkhovitinov LB-S
 Bolkhovitinov SSS

Bölkow 

 Bölkow Bö 46
 Bölkow Bö 102
 Bölkow Bö 103
 Bölkow Bö 104
 Bölkow Bö 105
 Bölkow Bö 106
 Bölkow Bö 108
 Bölkow Bö 207
 Bölkow Bö 208 Junior
 Bölkow Bö 209 Monsun
 Bölkow Bö 214
 Bölkow Phoebus
 Bölkow P-166/3 Flying Jeep

Bollinger-Koppen 

(Lynn L Bollinger-Otto C Koppen, MIT, Cambridge, MA)
 Bollinger-Koppen Helioplane 1
 Bollinger-Koppen Helioplane 2
 Bollinger-Koppen Helioplane 4

Bolte 

(Bolte Aircraft Co, Des Moines, IA)
 Bolte Limousine
 Bolte LW-1
 Bolte LW-2 Sportplane
 Bolte LW-3 Coupe
 Bolte LW-4

Bolz

(William H Bolz Jr, Palmyra, NE)
 Bolz BB-1
 Bolz BB-2
 Bolz BB-3

Bombardier 

 Bombardier 415
 Bombardier BD-100
 Bombardier BD-700
 Bombardier Challenger 300
 Bombardier Challenger 310
 Bombardier Challenger 350
 Bombardier Challenger 604
 Bombardier Challenger 605
 Bombardier Challenger 650
 Bombardier Challenger 750
 Bombardier Challenger 800
 Bombardier CL-215
 Bombardier CL-415
 Bombardier CRJ-100
 Bombardier CRJ-200
 Bombardier CRJ-440
 Bombardier CRJ-700
 Bombardier CRJ-705
 Bombardier CRJ-900
 Bombardier CRJ-900LR
 Bombardier CRJ-1000
 Bombardier CSeries
 Bombardier Dash-8 Turbocharger
 Bombardier Global 5000
 Bombardier Global 5500
 Bombardier Global 6000
 Bombardier Global 6500
 Bombardier Global 7500
 Bombardier Global 8000
 Bombardier Global Express XRS
 Bombardier Global Express
 Bombardier Learjet 55
 Bombardier Learjet 60
 Bombardier Learjet 70
 Bombardier Learjet 75
 Bombardier Sentinel
 Bombardier BRJX

Bomhoff 

(Bomhoff, Canada County, OK)
 Bomhoff biplane

Bonbrake 

(L. Dewey Bonbrake, Kansas City, KS)
 Bonbrake Parasol

Boncourt-Audenis-Jacob 
(Monsieur Boncourt, Charles Audenis & Jean Jacob)
 B.A.J. IVC.2 (Type IV)

Bond 

(John Bond, Cupertino, CA)
 Bond Sky Dancer

Bone 

(R.O. Bone Co., 415 E Industrial Ave, Inglewood, CA)
 Bone P-1
 ROBC Sport
 Bone Golden Eagles
 Bone Parasol P-2

Bonnel

(André Bonnel)
Aile volante Bonnel

Bonnet-Labranche

(Albert et Emile Bonnet-Labranche)
 Bonnet-Labranche No.1
 Bonnet-Labranche No.2
 Bonnet-Labranche No.3
 Bonnet-Labranche No.4 1909 monoplane
 Bonnet-Labranche No.5 1910 biplane
 Bonnet-Labranche No.6
 Bonnet-Labranche No.7
 Bonnet-Labranche No.8

Bonney 

(Leonard Warden Bonney, Wellington, OH)
 Bonney Gull

Bonomi 

See: Aeronautica Bonomi

Booker 
(Carr E. Booker, Raleigh, NC)
 Booker Hummingbird

Boom
(Boom Technology)
 Boom XB-1 Baby Boom
 Boom Supersonic

Booth 

(H.T. Booth. Freeport, NY)
 Booth 1931 biplane

Bopp 

(Cecil W Bopp, Waterloo, IA)
 Bopp PM-1

Borchers 

(Lowell J. Borchers, Mt Vernon, OH)
 Borchers Delta Stingray

Bordoni
 Bordoni BGM.2

Borel 
(see also: SGCIM)
(Etablissements Borel / Gabriel borel)
 Borel 1910 monoplane 
 Borel 1911 1-seat monoplane
 Borel 1911 2-seat monoplane
 Borel 1911 2-seat metal monoplane
 Borel 1911 military monoplane
 Borel 1912 L'Obus monoplane
 Borel 1912 1-seat monoplane
 Borel 1912 2-seat monoplane
 Borel 1912 2-seat monoplane (2) cowled gnome engine & balanced elevators
 Borel 1912 2-seat floatplane simple 4-strut float supports
 Borel 1912 2-seat floatplane (2) double diagonal float strut bracing
 Borel 1912 2-seat floatplane (3) wing root l/e cutouts
 Borel 1912 2-seat amphibian
 Borel 1913 1-seat monoplane fully covered
 Borel 1913 2-seat monoplane no cross axle
 Borel 1913 2-seat floatplane N-strut float supports + cutouts
 Borel 1913 military monoplane
 Borel Chemet 2-seater monoplane (No.7 at Paris-Deauville)
 Borel Chemet 2-seater monoplane (2) (No.10 Type Tamise)
 Borel Védrines 1-seat monoplane
 Borel Mestach 1-seat monoplane
 Borel-Ruby Torpille pusher monoplane
 Borel Bo.11
 Borel C1
 Borel C2 (Type 3000)
 Borel Aeroyacht type Denhaut I
 Borel Aeroyacht type Denhaut II
 Borel Aeroyacht type Denhaut III
 Borel type Monaco
 Borel-Odier BO-T
 Borel-Odier BO-C
 Borel-Boccacio Type 3000 (C2)
 Borel racer

Borgward 

 Borgward BFK-1 Kolibri

Borodics

 Borodics Lurko

Borovkov-Florov 

 Borovkov-Florov 7211
 Borovkov-Florov I-207
 Borovkov-Florov I-207/M-63
 Borovkov-Florov D

Borucki
(Stefan Borucki)
 Borucki monoplane
 Borucki biplane

Borzecki 
(Jozef Borzecki)
 Borzecki Alto-Stratus

Bosch
 Bosch eGyro

Bosshardt 

(Harry Bosshardt, 1850 Sacramento St, San Francisco, CA.
 Bosshardt HB-1

BOT Aircraft

(Oerlinghausen, Germany)
BOT SC07 Speed Cruiser

Botali-du-Riveau

 Botali-du-Riveau P.A.M.A. Type 1

Botali-Mandelli

 Botali-Mandelli Avionette

Bottoms 

(Leonard L. Bottoms Jr., Quinton, VA)
 Bottoms Skeeter

Bouchard 

(André Bouchard)
 Bouchard le Météque

Boudeau 
 Boudeau MB.10
 Boudeau MB.16

Bouffort-Lantres 
(Bouffort & Gérard Lantres) (see also:Lantres-Bouffort)
 Bouffort-Lantres BL.10

Boulton Paul
(Boulton & Paul Ltd, Boulton Paul Aircraft)
Boulton & Paul Phoenix II
Boulton & Paul P.3 Bobolink
Boulton & Paul P.6
Boulton & Paul P.7 Bourges
Boulton & Paul P.8 Atlantic
Boulton Paul P.9
Boulton Paul P.10
Boulton & Paul P.11 (Specification Type XXI)
Boulton & Paul P.12 Bodmin
Boulton & Paul P.15 Bolton
Boulton & Paul P.25 Bugle
Boulton & Paul P.29 Sidestrand
Boulton & Paul P.31 Bittern
Boulton & Paul P.32
Boulton & Paul P.33 Partridge
Boulton & Paul P.64 Mailplane
Boulton & Paul P.71A
Boulton & Paul P.75 Overstrand
Boulton & Paul P.79
Boulton Paul P.82 Defiant
Boulton Paul P.90
Boulton Paul P.92 - not built
Boulton Paul P.92/2 
Boulton & Paul P.93 - internal designation for Blackburn Roc production by BP
Boulton Paul P.96 - proposal to specification F.18/40 - single engine
Boulton Paul P.97 - proposal to specification F.18/40 - twin engined
Boulton Paul P.99 - proposal to specification F.6/42
Boulton Paul P.105 - naval torpedo-bomber
Boulton Paul P.107 - proposal for long range fighter
Boulton Paul P.108 Balliol - to specification T.7/45
Boulton Paul P.111
Boulton Paul P.113 - proposal for supersonic research aircraft
Boulton Paul P.119 - proposal for jet trainer (lost to de Havilland Vampire T.11)
Boulton Paul P.120
Boulton Paul P.121
Boulton Paul P.122
Boulton Paul P.124 - jet trainer (lost to Hunting Percival Jet Provost)
Boulton Paul P.146 - Proposed VTOL airliner.

Bounsall

((Edward & Curtis) Bounsall Aircraft, Mesquite, NV)
Bounsall Prospector
Bounsall Super Prospector

Bourdon 

((Allen P) Bourdon Aircraft Corp, E Greenwich, RI, 1930: Merged with Viking Flying Boat Co.)
 Bourdon Kitty Hawk
 Bourdon B-2 Kittyhawk
 Bourdon B-4 Kittyhawk

Bourgois-Sénémaud 
(Paul Bourgois with Sénémaud as engineer and Deckert as test pilot at a workshop in Levallois-Perret)
 Bourgois-Sénémaud 10
 Bourgois-Sénémaud AT.1
 Bourgois-Sénémaud AT.35
 Bourgois-Sénémaud AT.40
 Bourgois-Sénémaud BT
 Bourgois AM 50

Bourn 
(Clarence H. Bourn, Dallas, TX)
 Bourn B-1

Bouvet-de Rougé 
(Marcel Bouvet and Charles de Rougé)
 Bouvet-de Rougé Elion

Bowers
(Peter M Bowers, Seattle, WA)
 Bowers Fly Baby
 Bowers Bi-Baby
 Bowers Namu II

Bowlby 

((Richard "Dick") Bowlby Airplane Company, 1510 N Fairview and 413 S Market St, Wichita, KS)
 Bowlby Sunbeam

Bowlus

 Bowlus 1-S-2100
 Bowlus BA-100 Baby Albatross
 Bowlus BS-100 Super Albatross
 Bowlus SP-1 Paper Wing
 Bowlus/Nelson BB-1 Dragonfly

Bowman 

(Elmer Bowman, Owatonna, MN)
 Bowman 1930 monoplane
 Bowman 1940 biplane

Bowyer 

(Jack B. Bowyer, Wichita, KS)
 Bowyer BW-1

Boyd 

(Chester M & W Hunter Boyd, Logan Field, Baltimore, MD)
 Boyd Flying Craft Model A
 Boyd Flying Craft Model C

Boyer 

(Francois Boyer)
 Boyer BF.01
 Boyer BF.02
 Boyer B.II

Boyd 
(Gary Boyd)
 Boyd G.B.1

References

Further reading

External links

 List of aircraft (Bf)